Mark Anthony is an American author who lives and writes in Colorado.

Career
Anthony wrote a number of novels based on Dungeons & Dragons published worlds, Forgotten Realms, Dragonlance, and Ravenloft. His first such novel was Crypt of the Shadowking in The Harpers series, and he has written several short stories as well.

Anthony was commissioned by TSR to write a novel about Drizzt Do'Urden called The Shores of Dusk by the time Wizards of the Coast had purchased TSR; however, Wizards declined to publish Anthony's completed novel in favor of bringing back R. A. Salvatore to write about Drizzt, starting with The Silent Blade (1998).

Anthony is best known for The Last Rune series, which he developed to explore the idea that reason and wonder need not exist in conflict. Recently he has written a trilogy under the pseudonym Galen Beckett, beginning with a novel The Magicians and Mrs. Quent, whose blurb, similarly to The Last Rune, claims that the book was written to given an answer to the question "what if there was a fantastical cause underlying the social constraints and limited choices confronting a heroine in a novel by Jane Austen or Charlotte Bronte?".

Partial bibliography

The Last Rune series
 Beyond the Pale (1998)
 The Keep of Fire (1999)
 The Dark Remains (2001)
 Blood of Mystery (2002)
 The Gates of Winter (2003)
 The First Stone (2004)

The Magicians and Mrs. Quent series
 The Magicians And Mrs. Quent (2008) (as Galen Beckett)
 The House on Durrow Street (2010) (as Galen Beckett)
 The Master of Heathcrest Hall (2012) (as Galen Beckett)

Forgotten Realms novels
 Crypt of the Shadowking (1993)
 Curse of the Shadowmage (1995)
 Escape from Undermountain (1996)

Dragonlance novels
 Kindred Spirits (with Ellen Porath) (1991)

Ravenloft novels
 Tower of Doom (1994)

References

External links
Mark Anthony's official website
Interview at SFFWorld.com

Galen Beckett's official website

20th-century American male writers
20th-century American novelists
21st-century American male writers
21st-century American novelists
American fantasy writers
American male novelists
Dungeons & Dragons game designers
Living people
Place of birth missing (living people)
Year of birth missing (living people)